Will Hardy (born January 21, 1988) is an American professional basketball coach and former collegiate player who is the head coach for the Utah Jazz of the National Basketball Association (NBA).

Professional career

San Antonio Spurs and Boston Celtics
After graduating from Williams College, Hardy was connected with San Antonio Spurs head coach Gregg Popovich through a member of the basketball staff at Williams College who was an associate of Popovich and recommended him for an internship thanks to his high basketball IQ. Hardy coached the Spurs Summer League team for several years while working in other roles for the main team. Before the 2021–22 NBA season, Hardy joined the Boston Celtics as assistant for head coach Ime Udoka.

Utah Jazz
On June 29, 2022, the Utah Jazz hired Hardy as their head coach, making him the first head coach hired under the new ownership of Ryan Smith.

References

External links
 Williams Ephs bio

1988 births
Living people
Boston Celtics assistant coaches
San Antonio Spurs assistant coaches
Utah Jazz coaches
Williams College alumni